The men's 400 metres hurdles at the 1974 European Athletics Championships was held in Rome, Italy, at Stadio Olimpico on 3 and 4 September 1974.

Medalists

Results

Final
4 September

Semi-finals
3 September

Semi-final 1

Semi-final 2

Heats
3 September

Heat 1

Heat 2

Heat 3

Heat 4

Participation
According to an unofficial count, 24 athletes from 14 countries participated in the event.

 (2)
 (2)
 (2)
 (1)
 (2)
 (1)
 (2)
 (1)
 (1)
 (3)
 (1)
 (1)
 (3)
 (2)

References

400 metres hurdles
400 metres hurdles at the European Athletics Championships